Phassus huebneri is a moth of the family Hepialidae. It is known from Mexico and Costa Rica.

References

Moths described in 1838
Hepialidae